Maria Angelica Caruso (born October 12, 1980) is a Pittsburgh native dancer, choreographer, actor, director, academic, social activist, fitness and wellness practitioner, and entrepreneur whose enterprise encompasses brand models focused in the arts, education, entertainment, and wellbeing sectors. Caruso's multifaceted conglomerate is comprised of four performance companies, a dance conservatory, a fitness program, and a dance movement therapy system, all under the auspices of the Bodiography brand.

The alliance of organizations under her leadership include a production syndicate titled M-Train
Productions, the dance conservatory Bodiography Center for Movement, and an affiliation with an academic
institution of higher learning at La Roche University where she directs creative and innovative initiatives in the Performing Arts Department. All the encompassing entities led by Ms. Caruso's vision are known for their commitment to health and wellness in the arts and their championing of positive change in communities regionally and globally.

In addition to her catalog of over 100 ballets created specifically for her company of Bodiography artists, her choreographic works have been innovated for a collection of the world’s most esteemed dance companies, earning them support from their respective ministries of culture and tourism. As a dramatic stage performer, Caruso is best known for her critically acclaimed solo, Metamorphosis, which began off-Broadway in 2021 and followed with a global tour and run in London’s West End in the summer of 2022. Her final sold-out performance at the Lyric Theatre was filmed live on July 4th of 2022 and is available on Broadway On Demand.

Personal life 
Caruso is married to Dr. Alan J. Russell. Dr. Russell is the Vice President of Biologics at Amgen. Caruso has five step-children.

Early Training 
Maria Caruso grew up in Rural Valley, PA, outside of Pittsburgh. Caruso's mother and father split when she was young, and dance soon became a therapeutic outlet for her. Luba Takamoto was Maria's first influential teacher. Working with Takamoto instilled the academic value of dance in Caruso. Maria then studied at Sue Hewitt Dance Studio in Indiana, PA, and Hewitt became another of Maria's early mentors. Caruso graduated high school early, at age 16, and continued her education as a BFA student in Florida State University’s dance program. While studying at Florida State, Maria began to mature and no longer fit the traditional ballet body stereotypes. Anjali Austin, one of Maria's professors, became her mentor at FSU and helped her through this period. This inspired Caruso to later open a school that would serve the needs of dancers with non-stereotypical ballet bodies. After graduation from FSU and returning to Pittsburgh, Caruso earned a master's degree in professional leadership from Carlow University.

Dance performance career 
Caruso's performance career includes work with artists such as Anjali Austin, Ilana Suprun Clyde, Ze’eva Cohen, Lynne Taylor Corbett, Johan Renvall, and James Martin. Upon retirement from dancing with Bodiography in 2015, Caruso traveled the world with her solo work and continues to do so to date.  In 2017, she created her first full-length mixed genre solo concert, titled Phoenix Rising, where she worked to incorporate genres of dance that she had never performed, such as hip-hop, lindy hop, and art installation, along with modern, contemporary, and ballet works. In 2018, Caruso was honored to receive a license from Martha Graham Resources to perform Martha Graham’s iconic Lamentation solo, for which she has continued to perform on select solo tours. This same year, she also premiered another solo show, titled Metamorphosis, at the Karmiel Dance Festival in Israel. The solo show toured 4 continents between 2018-2020 with plans for a final performance stop in the USA the On February 29, 2020. Caruso anticipated performing one last time in her home of Pittsburgh, preparing to announce the off-Broadway run of her 80’s ballet, Rearview Mirror, her Movement Factory and many developments in her enterprise. Performing for a sold out audience to critical acclaim, she booked multiple performances in Brazil, the UK, and Italy the next day and set off on tour until it was disrupted by the global COVID-19 pandemic. During the pandemic, Caruso’s unrelenting work ethic and commitment to adapting, won her an invitation to present both her 80’s rock ballet, Rearview Mirror, and her solo show, Metamorphosis, simultaneously. She was the first to open live dance in New York City’s commercial Broadway sector post-pandemic, and she was the first dancer in history to star in two shows at two different theaters on the same night. Performing in both shows for nine weeks led to an extended run of Metamorphosis off-Broadway. The show closed at the Actor’s Temple Theatre on October 31, 2021, and the critical acclaim supported Caruso’s transition to a global tour.

Following a five-month global tour of Metamorphosis from November of 2021-May of 2022, Caruso prepared for a limited engagement in the West End of London at the Lyric Theatre.  There she won critical acclaim for the work being hailed as a “masterclass from of the top dance practitioners of the world” and recognizing the show as being a “raw, powerful, and expressive performance which is an absolute feat of strength and athleticism.”  Caruso is said to be working on the sequel to Metamorphosis with an anticipated opening in the West End in 2023. Her final sold-out performance at the Lyric Theatre was filmed live on July 4th of 2022 and is available for viewing on Broadway On Demand.

Broadway 
Caruso’s off-Broadway credits include an 80’s dance revue, Rearview Mirror, and her solo show, Metamorphosis.

Acting career 
Caruso had her acting debut in 2020 playing a leading role, Connie Scuccifuffio, in Anthony J Wilkinson's My Big Gay Italian Midlife Crisis, directed by Sonia Blangiardo.

As an actress, she is most appreciated for her comedic roles in theater and her online film series, Living The Life with Eloise Le Poire, where she embodies her alter-ego that lives in her closet.

Bodiography 
Caruso founded Bodiography in New York City in 2000.  The company was relocated to the Pittsburgh neighborhood of Squirrel Hill at the historic site of Gene Kelly’s dance studio in 2001 and is home to a professional contemporary ballet company ballet company, a sister company in Charlotte, North Carolina, a company of retired artists in BCB3, a pre-professional company in BCB2, fitness and wellness programs, a dance injury clinic in partnership with UPMC Health Plan, and a dance conservatory with an accredited college preparatory program in collaboration with La Roche University. Bodiography Contemporary Ballet, now called Maria Caruso’s Bodiography, presents a multi-genre movement vocabulary including modern, jazz, and pedestrian movement solidly supported by the classical ballet technique. The teaching and performing artists of Bodiography engage in a full performance and tour season while maintaining educational outreach engagements at Bodiography Center for Movement, La Roche University, and a variety of public and private schools and arts education institutions in the region. All artists in the company are also trained facilitators of Caruso’s fitness and movement therapy systems.

Caruso's creation of the Bodiography® Fitness and Strength Training System is based on a system of compounding exercises with the utilization of multiple props in a mat based class. The program has found great success particularly on the east coast of the United States. With over 100 trained instructors in a variety of fitness and dance environments, the fitness system assists in spreading the company's over arching message of dance being an inclusive art form. Beyond the national reach of the program, the Bodiography® Fitness and Strength Training System classes can be found in many places in the Pittsburgh area, and Caruso’s fitness video is available to the world having launched in June 2019. 

The creation of the Bodiography® Dance Movement Therapy System is based on the extraction of human emotion as a means of creative expression.  Through the use of a choreographic algorithm, Caruso's system works to create movement structures and phrases based on the thoughts, feelings, and ideas of individuals with shared experiences.  The movement therapy system is currently being utilized in a variety of hospitals, schools, and behavioral health programs across the US through certified facilitators.

Bodiography Leadership
 Lauren Suflita Skrabalak – Artistic Director of Bodiography Contemporary Ballet
 Kirstie Corso – Director of the Bodiography Center for Movement Student Company 
 Isaac Ray – Co-Director of the Bodiography Center for Movement Student Company

Entrepreneurship 
In 2020, Caruso announced her expansion into several new facets of business including her presenting and publishing branches and the development of her new performing arts facility, The Movement Factory, in the North Shore of Pittsburgh, PA. The Movement Factory, slated to open in February 2022, was expected to offer a 175 seat theater, 4 studios, classrooms, offices, and a home to M-Train Productions and The Arts Inclusive. Following the success of Caruso’s, Metamorphosis, in the West End, both the Movement Factory and the Arts Inclusive projects were discontinued in an effort to pursue larger projects on the West Coast and abroad through the production syndicate, M-Train Productions.

Choreography by Caruso 
 141 Total Works to Date 
 4 Full-length Ballets with Original Scores
 2 Full-length Theater Installations with Original Scores
 21 Full-length Ballets without Original Scores
 1 Full-length Dance Film
 56 Concert Works
 3 Concert Work with Original Score
 14 Solo Works
 29 Commissions
 11 Collegiate Works

Commissioned Works by
 ARB Dance Company
 Cisne Negro
 Emergence Dance Company 
 Bermuda Civic Ballet 
 Graham 2 
 Skidmore College 
 Mercyhurst University 
 Butler Community College 
 Sounds of Jewish Music Festival (4 works) 
 Open Door Studio Pre-Professional Company 
 Warped Dance Company 
 Winthrop University 
 Northwest School for the Arts 
 Charlotte Dance Festival 
 Falling Water’s 75 th Anniversary 
 Laurel Youth Ballet 
 Fluidity Dance Company (3 works) 
 Brooks and Company Dance 
 North Allegheny High School 
 Garrett Lakes Arts Festival 
 Elsie Awards Honoring Rob Marshall

Noted Works
 The Last Dance (2022)
 Orchids (2022)
 Emerald City (2021)
 Lumiere (2021)
 Ornamental Ecstasy (2021)
 The Hunt (2020)
 Blackbird Song (2020)
 Karma (2020)
 Berth (2020)
 Psalm 23 (2020)
 Light of Love II (2020)
 No Strings Attached (2020)
 Provenance (2019)
 Rearview Mirror (2019
 Vespers (2019)
 Billboard (2019)
 Prism (2019)
 Air (2019)
 Light of Love Remastered (2019)
 Runaway Runway (2019)
 Valley of Her (2019)
 Isabelle De Borchgrave Exhibition (2018)
 Submerged (2018)
 Break the Verse (2018)
 Really?! (2018)
 Michaelangelo (2018)
 Doors and Windows (2018)
 Unblemished Disclosure (2017)
 Changed Again (2017)
 Shapes of Us (2017)
 My Mozart (2017) 
 Connectivity Suite (2017)
 Kindred Pulse (2017)
 Lullaby (2017)
 Justice and Joanne (2017)
 Walkways (2017)
 I Am Now (2017)
 Pathways (2017)
 Tempered (2017)	
 Meditation of Killer Heels (2016) 
 Change (2016) 
 The Lending Heart (2016) 
 Uncharted Grace (2016)
 Parabola (2016)
 Jointly Driven (2015)
 My Journey (2015) 
 Light of Love (2015)
 Messiah (2015) 
 Charlotte Dance Festival - Within the Confines (2015)
 Curious Spirals (2015)
 I Will Be Earth (2015)
 Snowflakes in the Cemetery (2015) 
 Light of Love (2015) 
 Life Tides (2015)
 Laudate (2015)
 Follow the Light (2015) 
 Fauré Requiem (2014) 
 Ave Maria (2014)
 Left Leg, Right Brain (The Frank Ferraro Story) (2014) 
 Lux Aeterna (2013) 
 Bonsoir (2013)
 Led by Light (2013) 
 Whispers of Light (2013) 
 Day Awakening (2013)
 From Above (2013)
 Parlour (2012) 
 Hallelujah (2012)
 Our Notebook (2012) 
 5 Hebrew Love Songs (2012)
 Pieces of My Puzzle (2012) 
 From Me To You (2012) 
 Carmina Burana (2012) 
 Untitled (2012)
 Fractured and Rebuilt (2012) 
 Somebody (2012)
 Eyes Off You (2012)
 Eyes Wide Open (2012) 
 Sectional Sentiments (2011) 
 Wet (2011)
 108 Minutes (2011) 
 Bodi (2011) 
 Heart (Function vs. Emotion)  (2010) 
 Pas de Deux (2010)
 No More Bad Hair Days  (2009) 
 Intimate Liaisons  (2009) 
 The String (2009)
 Something About Nothing  (2009) 
 Ognissanti Madonna (2008)
 At My Cliff (2008)
 Journey (2008)
 Bound (2008)
 Solace (2008 Restaged – Original 2005) 
 Mentality Toiled Empathy (2007) 
 Kaleidoscope (2007) 
 Timeless (2006)
 The Recital (2006)
 Reflections (2006)
 Love Lines (2005)
 80's Rock (2004)
 Tied and Bound (2004)
 Living Successions (2003)
 Millennium Confusion (2002)
 Given (2002)
 Smoke (2002)
 18 Months (2002)
 Envisage (2002)
 Ascension (2001)
 Relativity (2001)
 Transit Euphony (2000)

Presentations 
 Tedx Talk (2016)

Writing 
Bodiography Dance Movement Therapy System: The Healing Power of Dance and Movement for EveryBODY (2013)
The profound results of Caruso's research, supported by Highmark Blue Cross/Blue Shield in 2014, catapulted the success of the Dance Movement Therapy program and provided a platform for training more dance movement therapy facilitators in the Pittsburgh region and beyond.

Bodiography Fitness and Strength Training System: The Ballet Workout for Every-BODY (2012)

Recognition 
 Young Pittsburgher to Watch (2009)
 “America Inspired” Contest - Top 25 finalist (2011)
 Real Wedding: Maria Caruso + Alan Russell - Whirl Magazine (2015)
 2016 Fast Tracker - Pittsburgh Business Times (2016)
 Genius of Choreography - The Future Health Technology Summit (2016)
 Squirrel Hill Urban Coalition's Squirrel Hill Treasure (2017)
 Caruso was recognized in Dance Magazine (2020) https://www.dancemagazine.com/ballet-body-2646451850.html?rebelltitem=2#rebelltitem2

References 
 https://www.post-gazette.com/ae/theater-dance/2019/04/26/Bodiography-Ballet-Maria-Caruso-Martha-Graham-Horizons/stories/201904260011

 https://www.pghcitypaper.com/pittsburgh/bodiography-spring-concert-shows-off-star-dance-students/Content?oid=15085592

 https://www.pittsburghmagazine.com/Pittsburgh-Magazine/April-2019/Swap-Meet-Graham-2-Joins-Bodiography-in-Horizons/

 https://trustarts.org/production/61319/bodiography-presents-horizons

 https://artsair.wordpress.com/2018/10/11/caruso-wows-and-bodiography-entertains-in-butler-program/

 https://triblive.com/local/pittsburgh-allegheny/horizons-a-collaboration-between-dance-companies-at-at-byham-theater/

 https://myemail.constantcontact.com/Bodiography-s-Global-Reach-in-2019-.html?soid=1105614872013&aid=3amgaSAvJQk

 http://triblive.com/aande/moreaande/6196734-74/caruso-dance-ballet#axzz3tSr9JRY7
 
 http://www.post-gazette.com/ae/theater-dance/2015/02/22/Dance-review-Bodiography-s-Maria-Caruso-shares-poignant-farewell-performance/stories/201502230029
 
 http://dancemagazine.com/dance-resources/dance-annual-directory/
 
 http://whirlmagazine.com/the-right-moves/
 
 http://www.coalhillreview.com/dance-interview-pittsburgh-ballerina-maria-caruso-premieres-her-final-stage-performance/
 
 http://trustarts.culturaldistrict.org/production/43541
 
 https://web.archive.org/web/20160224162331/http://www.yamahainstitute.org/vision-1-1-1-2/
 
 http://www.post-gazette.com/ae/2009/01/06/Young-Pittsburghers-to-watch-in-2009/stories/200901060247
 
 http://www.laroche.edu/Academics/Academic_Divisions/Humanities_Division/PERFORMING_ARTS/Degrees_and_Certificates/?pid=38
 
 http://whirlmagazine.com/maria-caruso-and-alan-russell/
 
 http://www.dhti.cmu.edu/dhti/alan-russell.html
 
 http://www.tedxyouthsquirrelhill.com/press/

 http://shuc.org/squirrel-hill-treasure-awards/

 https://www.dancemagazine.com/ballet-body-2646451850.html

 https://triblive.com/aande/more-a-and-e/dancer-takes-steps-to-open-the-movement-factory-on-pittsburghs-north-side/

 https://www.post-gazette.com/ae/theater-dance/2021/07/12/Maria-Caruso-Bodiography-Off-Broadway-NY-Metamorphosis-Rearview-Mirror/stories/202107120002

 https://vejasp.abril.com.br/coluna/terraco-paulistano/bailarina-americana-maria-caruso-bolsa-estudos-500-mil-dolares/

 https://www.post-gazette.com/ae/theater-dance/2022/02/21/Bodiography-Red-Carpet-Roll-Out-Movement-Factory/stories/202202150088

 https://triblive.com/aande/more-a-and-e/a-step-ahead-bodiography-celebrates-20-years-of-dance/

 https://www.metamorphosismac.com/reviews.cfm

 https://www.thereviewshub.com/maria-caruso-metamorphosis-lyric-theatre-london/

 http://musicaltheatremusings.co.uk/metamorphosis
 
 https://www.metamorphosismac.com/reviews.cfm

 https://northwestend.com/metamorphosis-lyric-theatre/

 https://t2conline.com/maria-caruso-takes-the-west-end/

 https://www1-folha-uol-com-br.translate.goog/ilustrada/2022/10/cisne-negro-cia-de-danca-lanca-esperar-o-inesperado-apos-enfrentar-crises.shtml?_x_tr_sl=pt&_x_tr_tl=en&_x_tr_hl=en&_x_tr_pto=sc
 
 https://www.salernotoday.it/eventi/danza-beyond-boundaries-teatro-dei-barbuti-di-salerno.html

 https://www.broadwayworld.com/pittsburgh/article/Bodiography-Announces-New-Artistic-Director-20221128

 https://triblive.com/aande/theater-arts/pittsburgh-dancer-maria-carusos-one-woman-show-to-be-available-on-broadway-on-demand/

External links 
 http://company.bodiography.com//index.cfm?aid=3&artist=maria_caruso&CFID=25380445&CFTOKEN=480b3b8b418024b0-D67C8BF6-5056-8708-7564B42CECF18831

1980 births
American choreographers
American female dancers
American dancers
Living people
21st-century American women